John Selman (1839-1896), was an outlaw and sometimes lawman of the Old West.

John Selman may also refer to:

John Selman (died 1426), MP for Plympton Erle 1390-1411
John Selman (fl. 1414–1435), MP for Plympton Erle 1414-1435
John Selman (1744-1817), American privateer